Night Club is the third album by German eurodance group Mr. President, released in August 1997. This album features four hit singles: "Jojo Action", "Take Me to the Limit", "Where Do I Belong" and "Happy People".

Track listing

Charts

References

1997 albums
Mr. President (band) albums